Congratulations is a 2023 Gujarati drama film directed by Rehan Chaudhary. It stars Sharman Joshi and Manasi Parekh in lead roles. It is produced by Sharman Joshi, Jeegar Chauhan, Vedant Maheshwari and Rehan Chaudhary, and distributed by Rupam Entertainment Pvt. Ltd. The music is composed by Kedar Bhargav.

Cast 
 Sharman Joshi as Aditya
 Manasi Parekh as Ragini
 Jayesh Barbhaya as Dr Kartik 
 Ami Bhayani as Dr. Ira 
 Archan Trivedi as Kamlesh Mehta
 Swati Dave as Ramila Mehta

Production 
The film is produced by Sharman Joshi, Jeegar Chauhan, Vendant Maheshwari and Rehan Chaudhry.  Sharman Joshi, Jayesh Barbhaya and Ami Bhayani are debuting in Gujarati cinema with the film.

Soundtrack

Tracklist

Marketing and release 
The first poster was released on 3 January 2023. The trailer was released on 13 January 2023. The film released on 3 February 2023.

See also
 List of Gujarati films of 2023

References

External links 
 

2023 films
2020s Gujarati-language films
Films shot in Gujarat